Asili is a village on the southwest coast of Tutuila Island, American Samoa. It is located between Leone and 'Amanave. It is located in Lealataua County.

Both the Malagateine Stream and Asili Stream flow through Asili before discharging into the sea. A former World War II bunker is located near the shoreline. Several species of Gobie fish, as well as Mountain bass and Freshwater eel, have been recorded in Asili Stream. The Asili Stream originates at 1,190 ft. above sea level. It discharges near the center of the embayment that fronts the village. The main branch of the Malagateine Stream starts around the 520 ft contour along the east side of the Malagatiga Ridge.

Demographics

References

Villages in American Samoa
Tutuila